Huzhong District is a district of Daxing'anling Prefecture, Heilongjiang province, People's Republic of China.

In an average year, temperatures drop to or below  on more than 30 days.

Administrative divisions 
Huzhong District is divided into 4 towns. 
4 towns

Climate

Notes and references 

Huzhong